David Stanton may refer to:
 David Stanton (politician) (born 1957), Irish politician
 David Stanton (priest) (born 1960), British priest, Archdeacon of Westminster
 David L. Stanton, American Civil War general

See also
 David Stanton Tappan (1845–1922), president of Miami University
 Dave Stanton, American motorcycle racer